Gour Das Bysack (sometimes parts of his name have been transliterated as Gaur, Dass, Dos, Bysac) was a Bengali writer prominent in the late 19th century. He was known for his friendship with Michael Madhusudan Dutta. He died before 1901.

Biography 
Born in the Basak Family of Burabazar, he was a classmate of Michael Madhusudan Dutt while studying in Hindu College.  He was also a companion of social reformer Ishwar Chandra Vidyasagar. Although he did not influence the original writings, he was closely involved in the cultural field of the time. He played a significant role in the play 'Ratnabali'. During his career as a Deputy Magistrate, he wrote informative essays on traditional archeology wherever he went. While in Howrah, he wrote an article entitled Notes on a Buddhist Monastery at Bhot Bagan in Howrah.

He was a Fellow of Calcutta University, a member of the Philological Society of England and the Indian Association. He was a member and general secretary of the Bengal Royal Asiatic Society. He Also established a school in Baranagar.

Works published
 Journal of the Asiatic Society of Bengal. Vol. LIX. 189.pp. 50–9. Notes on a Buddhist Monastery at Bhot Bagan in Howrah

References

Bengali writers
19th-century Indian writers
1826 births
1899 deaths

 Writers from Kolkata